Nigerian passports  are issued to  Nigerian citizens to travel outside of Nigeria.  Nigeria now offers only electronic passports for new passport applications.  These electronic passports, known also as the e-passport, are classified as either "Standard" or "Official", depending on intended use.

Nigerian passports can be applied for either at the physical location of the Nigeria Immigration Services, or by making submission through its website.  Nigerians living in other countries may obtain passports through the nearest Nigerian embassy or consulate.

Passport
The official e-passport is primarily reserved for certain classes of government officials and Nigerian diplomats.

Nigerian citizens can travel to member states of the Economic Community of West African States (ECOWAS).

Visa requirements

In 2016, Nigerian citizens had visa-free or visa on arrival access to 66 countries and territories, ranking the Nigerian passport 91st in the world according to the Visa Restrictions Index.

See also
 ECOWAS passports
 List of passports
 Visa requirements for Nigerian citizens

References

External links
 Nigerian Embassy in the Netherlands
 Obtaining Nigeria e-passport
 Nigeria Immigration Service - Passport Information

Passports by country
Government of Nigeria
Law of Nigeria
Foreign relations of Nigeria
Nigerian nationality law